Dolenjske Toplice is a settlement near Novo Mesto in southeastern Slovenia and is the seat of the Municipality of Dolenjske Toplice. The area is part of the traditional region of Lower Carniola. The municipality is now included in the Southeast Slovenia Statistical Region. The town lies on the Sušica River, which joins the Krka 2 km north of town. It is a spa town known for its thermal baths established in 1658 by the Counts of Auersperg.

Name
The name of the settlement was changed from Toplice to Dolenjske Toplice in 1953. The historical German name was Töplitz.

Church
The parish church in the settlement is dedicated to Saint Anne and belongs to the Roman Catholic Diocese of Novo Mesto. It is a Gothic building that was restyled in the Baroque in the late 17th century.

References

External links

 Dolenjske Toplice on Geopedia
 Dolenjske Toplice municipal site

Populated places in the Municipality of Dolenjske Toplice
Spa towns in Slovenia